Erech can refer to:

 Erech the biblical city
 Erech (Middle-earth) - the fictional location from J. R. R. Tolkien's writings